Knut Magne Valle (born 5 August 1974 in Gjerstad) is a Norwegian heavy metal guitarist, songwriter, composer, recording studio owner, record producer and music arranger. Valle is best known as an Arcturus and Ulver (1998) band member.

Musical career 
Valle lives in Gjerstad, Aust-Agder. In 1990 he started Gjerstad Rock club. He went on Vefsn Folkehøyskole studying music with specialization in sound engineering in 1992. In 1996/1997 he studied at the Music Instrument Academy (MIA) in Moss. He has been a music teacher in Sunde Junior for 3 years, and is now guitar teacher at the Guitar Academy.

He runs Prestfoss Crusher sound and music studio, and organizes an annual festival Molla. He has produced music for over 50 different bands, at home and abroad. He also makes his own guitars. He previously ran Jester Records recording studio in Oslo, with bands as Mayhem, Arcturus and Ulver as customer list.

In 2011, Valle was awarded with Gjerstad Municipality Culture Award  for its longstanding efforts with Mill Festival and volunteering for musical and youth in the municipality. The mayor of Gjerstad stated among other things by awarding:

 Agderposten.no 5. November 2011

Personal life 
Valle is married and has three children.

Discography

With Arcturus 
La Masquerade Infernale (1997)
The Sham Mirrors (2002)
Sideshow Symphonies (2005)
Shipwrecked in Oslo DVD (2006)
 Arcturian (2015)

With Ulver 
Themes from William Blake's The Marriage of Heaven and Hell (1998)

As producer / guest  musician 
 Fleurety - Department of Apocalyptic Affairs (2000)
Ancestral Legacy – Trapped Within the Words (2008)   
Ancestral Legacy - Nightmare Diaries (2010) 
Aura Noir - Deep Tracts of Hell (1998)
Ragnarok - Diabolical Age (2000)
Aura Noir - Deep Dreams Of Hell (Compilation, 2005)
Mayhem -  Ordo Ad Chao (2007) 
 Ravencult - Temples Of Torment (2007)

References

External links 
Groove.no
Gitarskolen.no
Knut Magne Valle at Discogs
Metallum Archives

1974 births
Living people
Norwegian guitarists
Norwegian male guitarists
Black metal guitarists
Norwegian songwriters
Norwegian record producers
Ulver members
Arcturus (band) members
21st-century Norwegian guitarists
21st-century Norwegian male musicians